The volunteer's dilemma game models a situation in which each player can either make a small sacrifice that benefits everybody, or instead wait in hope of benefiting from someone else's sacrifice.

One example is a scenario in which the electricity supply has failed for an entire neighborhood. All inhabitants know that the electricity company will fix the problem as long as at least one person calls to notify them, at some cost. If no one volunteers, the worst possible outcome is obtained for all participants. If any one person elects to volunteer, the rest benefit by not doing so.

A public good is only produced if at least one person volunteers to pay an arbitrary cost. In this game, bystanders decide independently on whether to sacrifice themselves for the benefit of the group. Because the volunteer receives no benefit, there is a greater incentive for freeriding than to sacrifice oneself for the group. If no one volunteers, everyone loses. The social phenomena of the bystander effect and diffusion of responsibility heavily relate to the volunteer's dilemma.

Payoff matrix
The payoff matrix for the game is shown below:

When the volunteer's dilemma takes place between only two players, the game gets the character of the game "chicken". As seen by the payoff matrix, there is no dominant strategy in the volunteer's dilemma. In a mixed-strategy Nash equilibrium, an increase in N players will decrease the likelihood that at least one person volunteers, which is consistent with the bystander effect.

Examples in real life

The murder of Kitty Genovese
The story of Kitty Genovese is often cited as an example of the volunteer's dilemma. Genovese was stabbed to death outside her apartment building in Queens, New York, in 1964. According to a highly influential New York Times account, dozens of people witnessed the assault but did not get involved because they thought others would contact the police anyway and did not want to incur the personal cost of getting involved. Subsequent investigations have shown the original account to have been unfounded, and although it inspired sound scientific research, its use as a simplistic parable in psychology textbooks has been criticized.

The meerkat
The meerkat exhibits the volunteer's dilemma in nature. One or more meerkats act as sentries while the others forage for food. If a predator approaches, the sentry meerkat lets out a warning call so the others can burrow to safety. However, the altruism of this meerkat puts it at risk of being discovered by the predator.

See also
 Bystander effect
 Civil courage
Death of Cristina and Violetta Djeordsevic (Italy)
 Death of Wang Yue (China)
 Mamihlapinatapai
 Prisoner's dilemma
 Social loafing
 Tragedy of the Commons

References

Non-cooperative games
Dilemmas